Forficula mikado is a species of earwig in the family Forficulidae. They are found in the Palearctic realm, particularly in Japan.

References

External links
Forticula mikado: Images and occurrence data from GBIF

Forficulidae
Insects of Asia
Insects described in 1904
Insects of Japan
Palearctic insects